Monolatry (and ) is the belief in the existence of many gods, but with the consistent worship of only one deity. The term monolatry was perhaps first used by Julius Wellhausen.

Monolatry is distinguished from monotheism, which asserts the existence of only one god, and henotheism, a religious system in which the believer worships one god while accepting that others may worship different gods with equal validity.

Atenism 

The pharaoh Akhenaten, who was initially enthroned as Amenhotep IV, initially introduced Atenism in the fifth year (approximately 1348–1346 BCE) of his reign during the Eighteenth Dynasty of Egypt. He raised Aten, once a relatively obscure solar deity representing the disk of the Sun, to the status of supreme deity in ancient Egyptian religion.

The fifth year of his reign marked the beginning of his construction of a new capital, Akhetaten (Horizon of the Aten), at the site known today as "Amarna". Amenhotep IV officially changed his name to "Akhenaten" (Agreeable to the Aten) as evidence of his new worship. In addition to constructing a new capital in honor of Aten, Akhenaten also oversaw the construction of some of the most massive temple complexes of ancient Egypt, including one at Karnak and one at Thebes, close to the old temple of Amun.

In his ninth year of rule (approximately 1344–1342 BCE), Akhenaten declared a more radical version of his new religion, declaring Aten not merely the supreme god of the Egyptian pantheon but the only god of Egypt, with himself as the sole intermediary between the Aten and the Egyptian people. Key features of Atenism included a ban on idols and other images of the Aten, with the exception of a rayed solar disc in which the rays (commonly depicted ending in hands) appear to represent the unseen spirit of Aten. Aten was addressed by Akhenaten in prayers, such as the Great Hymn to the Aten.

The details of Atenist theology are still unclear. The exclusion of all but one god and the prohibition of idols was a radical departure from Egyptian tradition, but most scholars see Akhenaten as a practitioner of monolatry rather than monotheism, as he did not actively deny the existence of other gods; he simply refrained from worshiping any but Aten. It is known that Atenism did not solely attribute divinity to the Aten. Akhenaten continued the imperial cult, proclaiming himself the son of Aten and encouraging the people to worship him. The people were to worship Akhenaten; only Akhenaten and the pharaoh's wife Nefertiti could worship Aten directly.

Under Akhenaten's successors, Egypt reverted to its traditional religion, and Akhenaten himself came to be reviled as a heretic.

In ancient Israel 

Some historians have argued that ancient Israel originally practiced a form of monolatry or henotheism. Old Testament scholar John Day suggests that angels in Judaism are what became of the other gods once monotheism took over Israel. John McKenzie has stated: "In the ancient Near East the existence of divine beings was universally accepted without questions. [...] The question was not whether there is only one elohim, but whether there is any elohim like Yahweh."

Some scholars claim the Torah (Pentateuch) shows evidence of monolatry in some passages. The argument is normally based on references to other gods, such as the "gods of Egypt" in the Book of Exodus (Exodus 12:12). The Egyptians are also attributed powers that suggest the existence of their gods; in Exodus 7:11–13, after Aaron transforms his staff into a snake, Pharaoh's sorcerers do likewise. In the ancient Near East, magic was generally believed to exist, although the Israelites viewed magic as being malign in origin and were forbidden from it.

The Ten Commandments have been interpreted by some as evidence that the Israelites originally practiced monolatry. Exodus 20:3 reads, "you shall have no other gods before me", and they argue that the addition of "before me" at the end of the commandment indicates not only that other gods may exist, but also that they may be respected and worshiped so long as less than Yahweh. In the creation story of Genesis, Yahweh says "The man has now become like one of us, knowing good and evil. He must not be allowed to reach out his hand and take also from the tree of life and eat, and live forever."

There is evidence that the Israelites before the Babylonian captivity in the 6th century BCE did not adhere to monotheism. Much of this evidence comes from the Bible itself, which records that many Israelites chose to worship foreign gods and idols rather than Yahweh.

During the 8th century BCE, the monotheistic worship of Yahweh in Israel was in competition with many other cults, described by the Yahwist faction collectively as Baals. The oldest books of the Hebrew Bible reflect this competition, as in the books of Hosea and Nahum, whose authors lament the "apostasy" of the people of Israel and threaten them with the wrath of God if they do not give up their polytheistic cults.

On the other hand, medieval Jewish scholars often interpreted ancient texts to argue that the ancient Israelites were monotheistic. The Shema Yisrael is often cited as proof that the Israelites practiced monotheism. It was recognized by Rashi in his 11th century commentary to Deuteronomy 6:4 that the declaration of the Shema accepts belief in one god as being only a part of Jewish faith at the time of Moses but would eventually be accepted by all humanity.

A similar statement occurs in Maimonides' Thirteen Principles of Faith's second principle:

The Church of Jesus Christ of Latter-day Saints 

The Church of Jesus Christ of Latter-day Saints (LDS Church) teaches that God the Father, Jesus Christ and the Holy Ghost are three distinct beings belonging to one Godhead: "All three are united in their thoughts, actions, and purpose, with each having a fullness of knowledge, truth, and power." Latter-day Saints further believe that prayer should be directed to only God the Father in the name of Jesus Christ.

Jeffrey R. Holland has stated:

Latter-day Saints interpret Jesus' prayer in John 17:11, "Holy Father, keep through thine own name those whom thou hast given me, that they may be one, as we are" to refer to the characteristics, attributes and purpose that the Son shares with the Father in the hope that people can someday share in those as well. In Mormonism, being one with God means gaining immortality, perfection, eternal life, and the highest level in his kingdom. As D. Todd Christofferson states, "we may become one with God" as Jesus did.

Joseph Smith taught that humans can become joint-heirs with Christ and thereby inherit from God all that Christ inherits if they are proven worthy by following the laws and ordinances of the gospel. This process of exaltation means that humans can literally become gods through the atonement; thus, "god" is a term for an inheritor of the highest kingdom of God. 

To the extent that monolatry is not considered monotheism, the classification of Mormonism as monolatrous is strongly disputed among Latter-day Saints. Bruce R. McConkie stated that "if [monotheism] is properly interpreted to mean that the Father, Son, and Holy Ghost—each of whom is a separate and distinct godly personage—are one God, meaning one Godhead, then true saints are monotheists."

References

Further reading 
Robert Needham Cust (1895). Essay on the Common Features which Appear in All Forms of Religious Belief. Luzac & Co.
Robert Wright (journalist), The Evolution of God (2009) (esp. pages 132 et seq discussing conflict between Elijah and Jezebel).
 Mike Schroeder, author of 85 Pages In The Bible; Llumina Press 2005

External links 
 Moses and Monotheism by Jeffrey Tigay
 The Biblical Idea of Idolatry by Jose Faur, differentiating the monolatry authorized by the Bible from the idolatry/iconolatry which is proscribed therein

Polytheism
Monotheism
Theism
Religion in ancient Israel and Judah